The 1933–34 season in Swedish football, starting August 1933 and ending July 1934:

Honours

Official titles

Competitions

Promotions, relegations and qualifications

Promotions

League transfers

Relegations

Domestic results

Allsvenskan 1933–34

Allsvenskan promotion play-off 1933–34

Division 2 Norra 1933–34

Division 2 Östra 1933–34

Division 2 Västra 1933–34

Division 2 Södra 1933–34

National team results 

 Sweden: 

 Sweden: 

 Sweden: 

 Sweden: 

 Sweden: 

 Sweden:

National team players in season 1933–34

Notes

References 
Print

Online

 
Seasons in Swedish football